Genesco Inc. is an American publicly owned specialty retailer of branded footwear and accessories and is a wholesaler of branded and licensed footwear based in Nashville, Tennessee. Through its various subsidiaries, Genesco operates more than 1,455 retail stores throughout the United States, Puerto Rico, Canada, the United Kingdom, and the Republic of Ireland and wholesales branded and licensed footwear to more than 1,050 retail accounts. Founded as the Jarman Shoe Company in 1924 as a footwear manufacturer, the company changed its name to the General Shoe Company in 1931 and became a public company in 1939. The company took its current name, Genesco, in 1959. Genesco exited footwear manufacturing in 2002 and now contracts with independent, third parties located outside the United States to manufacture its branded and licensed footwear. In June 2011, Genesco acquired U.K. retail chain and web business Schuh. This was seen as a huge step for the business as it gave them an already well-established grounding in a market outside of the U.S.

Company history
James Franklin Jarman, J.H. Lawson and William Hatch Wemyss, all former salesmen for Carter Shoe Co. in Nashville, founded Jarman Shoe Company in 1924 as a footwear manufacturer. The company grew rapidly and took the name General Shoe Company in 1931. General Shoe Company's initial public stock offering took place in 1939.

By the 1950s, General Shoe had factories in many southern towns, especially in Genesco's home state of Tennessee. The company assumed its current name, Genesco, in 1959, two years after it was chosen as one of the stocks in the first S&P 500 Index. Under the leadership of W. Maxey Jarman, the ambitious son of co-founder J.F. Jarman, the company slowly began the process of diversifying away from strictly footwear manufacturing, especially as more of this was conducted overseas. It entered into fields such as sports, at one-time manufacturing and selling football (soccer) balls and at one point owned New York department store Bonwit Teller and five-and-dime store S. H. Kress & Co.

The company suffered from over-diversification at one point, and the ongoing manufacturing operations in the southern United States continued to depress results for a long period of time. The company was probably saved by its decision to reposition itself as a retailer. Genesco exited the business of shoe manufacturing when it closed Johnston & Murphy's Nashville, TN factory in 2002. Genesco now contracts with independent, third parties located outside the United States to manufacture its branded and licensed footwear.

Brands
The following is a list of retailers and brands owned by and licenses held by Genesco:
Johnston & Murphy – Retailer of better men's and women's footwear, apparel, luggage and leather goods sold in Genesco-owned Johnston & Murphy retail stores and wholesaler of footwear to department and specialty stores.
Dockers Footwear – Casual footwear marketed with the Dockers brand licensed from Levi Strauss & Co. and sold at wholesale to department and specialty stores
Journeys – Retailer of footwear for teens and young adults. The first Journeys retail store to open was the Rivergate Mall Journeys in Nashville, TN, opened by Genesco in December 1986.
Journeys Kidz – Retailer of footwear for children. Many of the brands and styles found in the normal Journeys stores can be found in smaller sizes in Journeys Kidz stores.
Schuh – U.K. retailer of footwear and other branded items. Genesco acquired in June 2011.
Little Burgundy – Montreal, Canada-based footwear retailer for trendy teens and young adults. Genesco acquired in 2015.

References

External links

News stories about Genesco from NashvillePost.com

 
Companies listed on the New York Stock Exchange
Companies based in Nashville, Tennessee
Retail companies established in 1924
1924 establishments in Tennessee
Footwear retailers of the United States